Rose Kennedy Schlossberg (born June 25, 1988) is an American actress, the oldest child of Caroline Kennedy, and first-born grandchild of John F. Kennedy. She is a 2010 graduate of Harvard University. Schlossberg has been described as a look-alike of her maternal grandmother, First Lady Jacqueline Kennedy Onassis. In 2016, Schlossberg, along with Mara Nelson-Greenberg, co-launched End Time Girls Club, an end time-apocalyptic web series on YouTube.

Early life 
Schlossberg was born on June 25, 1988, at Weill Cornell Medical Center in New York City, New York, to designer Edwin Schlossberg and Caroline Kennedy, the oldest and only surviving child of U.S. President John F. Kennedy and his wife First Lady Jacqueline Bouvier Kennedy Onassis. She was named after her maternal great-grandmother, Rose Kennedy. Schlossberg has two younger siblings, Tatiana and  Jack. Schlossberg's mother is a Catholic of Irish, French, Scottish, and English descent, while her father comes from an Orthodox Jewish family of Ukrainian descent. She was raised in her mother's religion, but also observes Jewish traditions, holidays and holy days.

During her early childhood, Schlossberg attended Brearley School on the Upper East Side of Manhattan. In first grade, she went on a school field trip to the American Museum of Natural History accompanied by her grandmother, Jacqueline Kennedy Onassis. "She was the only grandparent in the group," said a father whose daughter was in the same class as Schlossberg.

In 1999, Schlossberg's uncle John F. Kennedy Jr., with whom she was close, died in a plane crash.

Education 
In 2006, Schlossberg enrolled at Harvard College in Cambridge, Massachusetts where she earned a bachelor's degree in English studies, took film courses, and cultivated an interest in fashion. She graduated in 2010, going back to school a year later—at New York University's Interactive Telecommunications Program (ITP) —earning a Master of Professional Studies in 2013.

Career
In 2016, Schlossberg co-launched a comedy and end time-apocalyptic web series with Mara Nelson-Greenberg, titled End Times Girls Club, produced by Above Average Productions. The series follows two twentysomething young women, Bee (portrayed by Schlossberg) and Lara (portrayed by Nelson-Greenberg), as they give women comic tips to surviving the apocalypse. "It came up as a response to seeing the way that New York City responded to Hurricane Sandy, and how people were grossly underprepared – specifically, girls in damsel in distress mode," Schlossberg told Mashable. "I thought it would be interesting to create this world where girls have to be survivalists without compromising their cute factor."

Politics 
During the 2008 United States presidential election, Schlossberg donated to Barack Obama's 2008 campaign and volunteered for Democrat Alan Khazei's campaign for the United States Senate in the 2010 special election in Massachusetts.

References

External links 
End Time Girls Clubweb television series official website, in which Schlossberg portrays main character Bee. 

1988 births
Living people
20th-century American actresses
21st-century American actresses
American people of English descent
American people of French descent
American people of Irish descent
American people of Scottish descent
American people of Ukrainian-Jewish descent
Bouvier family
Kennedy family
Harvard University alumni
New York University alumni
American women comedians
Actresses from New York City
American Roman Catholics
American YouTubers
American web series actresses
Brearley School alumni
21st-century American comedians
People from the Upper East Side